Te Regalo el Mar may refer to:

"Te Regalo el Mar", 2007 song by Frank Reyes
"Te Regalo el Mar", 2013 song by Prince Royce from the album Soy el Mismo